Card Gymnasium is a multi-purpose arena in Durham, North Carolina.   It was home to the Duke University Blue Devils basketball team from its opening in 1930 until Cameron Indoor Stadium opened in 1940. During its years as home to the men's basketball team, it had a capacity of approximately 4,000. It was originally named “Duke Gymnasium” before being named after former Blue Devils head basketball coach, Wilbur Wade Card, in 1958. It currently serves as the home to Duke Wrestling and Fencing.

Predecessors
The two previous venues used by the basketball team still stand, a short walk from each other on the East Campus.

Immediately prior to the opening of Card Gymnasium, the games were held in Alumni Memorial Gymnasium, which had opened in 1924. That building stands west of the traffic circle, the Lilly Library and the tennis courts. It is now part of the Brodie Recreation Center.

The earliest games were played at an Angier B. Duke Gymnasium, otherwise known as "The Ark". It contained a smaller court than what is now standard. The building dates to 1898, and intercollegiate basketball was first played there in about 1906. After the team left at the end of 1923, the building was remodeled for various purposes through the years, eventually becoming a dance studio. It stands just east of the traffic circle and the East Campus Wellness Center.

References

Basketball venues in North Carolina
Defunct college basketball venues in the United States
Sports venues in Durham, North Carolina
Duke Blue Devils men's basketball
1930 establishments in North Carolina
Sports venues completed in 1930
College wrestling venues in the United States
Fencing venues